Sarraut is a surname. Notable people with the surname include:

Albert Sarraut (1872–1962), French politician
Maurice Sarraut (1869–1943), French newspaper publisher